The Mixed team competition at the 2017 World Championships was held on 19 February 2017.

First introduced at the 2007 championships, the mixed team event consists of one run each of men's skeleton, women's skeleton, 2-man bobsleigh, and 2-women bobsleigh.

Results
The runs were started at 14:55.

References

Mixed team